Sclerobunus is a genus of harvestman that occurs in western North America.

Species
Sclerobunus was revised in a 2014 study, which described 5 new species, and Cyptobunus as a junior synonym of Sclerobunus. In addition, several populations formerly considered subspecies were elevated to full species rank.
 Sclerobunus cavicolens Banks, 1905 — Montana
 Sclerobunus glorietus (Briggs, 1971) — New Mexico
 Sclerobunus idahoensis (Briggs, 1971) — Idaho and Montana
 Sclerobunus jemez Derkarabetian & Hedin, 2014 — New Mexico
 Sclerobunus klomax Derkarabetian & Hedin, 2014 — New Mexico
 Sclerobunus madhousensis Briggs, 1971 — Utah
 Sclerobunus nondimorphicus Briggs, 1971 Oregon, Washington, and British Columbia
 Sclerobunus robustus (Packard, 1877) —  Arizona, Colorado, New Mexico, and Utah
 Sclerobunus skywalkeri Derkarabetian & Hedin, 2014 — New Mexico
 Sclerobunus speoventus Derkarabetian & Hedin, 2014 — Colorado
 Sclerobunus steinmanni Derkarabetian & Hedin, 2014 — Colorado
 Sclerobunus ungulatus Briggs, 1971 — Nevada

References

Harvestmen
Arachnids of North America
Endemic fauna of the United States